The 2002–03 IFA Shield Final was the 108th final of the IFA Shield, the second oldest football competition in India, and was contested between Kolkata giants East Bengal and Churchill Brothers of Goa on 22 January 2003.

East Bengal won the final 5–4 via penalties after the game remained goal-less after extra-time, to claim their 27th IFA Shield title.

Route to the final

East Bengal

East Bengal entered the 2002-03 IFA Shield as the defending champions and were allocated into Group A alongside Indian Bank, Churchill Brothers and Tollygunge Agragami. In the opening game against Indian Bank, East Bengal won 2–1 with goals from Tushar Rakshit and Amjad Ali Khan. Joseph scored the only goal for Indian Bank. In the second game, East Bengal faced a setback as they lost 0–1 against Churchill Brothers with Aqueel Ansari scoring the only goal for the goan side in the 83rd minute. In the last group game against Tollygunge Agragami, East Bengal won 2–1 with goals from Trijit Das and Suley Musah as they secured their place in the semi-finals. In the Semi-Final, East Bengal defeated Vasco 2–0 with goals from Suley Musah and Jiten Rai as they entered the final.

Churchill Brothers

Churchill Brothers entered the 2002-03 IFA Shield as one of the NFL teams and were allocated into Group A alongside Indian Bank, East Bengal and Tollygunge Agragami. In the opening game against Indian Bank, Churchill Brothers drew 0–0. In their second game against Tollygunge Agragami, Churchill failed to win again as they drew 1–1 with Kasif Jamal scoring the Churchill but Mehtab Hossain equalised for Tollygunge. In their last group game, Churchill Brothers stunned the defending champions East Bengal as they won 1–0 with Aqueel Ansari scoring the only goal of the match as they reached the semis. In the Semi-Finals, Churchill Brothers defeated Tata Football Academy 3—2 in a thriller of a game. Kasif Jamal, Yusif Yakubu and Ratan Singh scored for Churchill Brothers while Bhola Prasad and Debadrata Roy scored for TFA.

Match

Details

See also
 IFA Shield 2002-03, rsssf.com
 IFA Shield 2002-03, indianfootball.de

References

IFA Shield finals
2002–03 in Indian football
East Bengal Club matches
Churchill Brothers FC Goa matches
Football competitions in Kolkata